The 2005 Ukrainian Figure Skating Championships took place between 23 December and 25 December 2004 in Kyiv. Skaters competed in the disciplines of men's singles, ladies' singles, pair skating, and ice dancing on the senior and junior levels. The results were used to choose the teams to the 2005 World Championships and the 2005 European Championships.

Results

Men

Ladies

Pairs

Ice dancing

External links
 results

Ukrainian Figure Skating Championships
2004 in figure skating
Ukrainian Figure Skating Championships, 2005
2004 in Ukrainian sport
2005 in Ukrainian sport
December 2004 sports events in Ukraine